The Golden Fool is a fantasy novel by American writer Robin Hobb, the second in her Tawny Man Trilogy. It was published in 2002.

Plot summary

Fitz has succeeded in rescuing Prince Dutiful from the clutches of the Piebald rebels. But once again the cost of protecting the Farseer line has been dear: Nighteyes is dead.
 
Fitz, though bitter and grieving after the death of his beloved wit-partner, the wolf Nighteyes, reluctantly takes the post of Skillmaster to teach prince Dutiful the Skill. He feels he must since he is almost Dutiful's father. Dutiful, the heir to the throne, was conceived by Verity using Fitz's body fifteen years earlier with the use of the skill, and because of this is both Skilled and Witted. Fitz is not a great teacher and barely has control of his own Skill, but he is the only one left that has been actually taught how to use it. He knows that Dutiful must be protected from the addictive qualities of the Skill, as well as the dangerous temptations of the Wit and the political machinations surrounding both as the Piebalds threaten to throw the Six Duchies into civil war.

At the urging of his old mentor the Master Assassin Chade, now Queen Kettricken's Lord Councillor, he also attempts to seek new Skill users as companions for Dutiful. Maintaining a pose as the servant Tom Badgerlock to the Fool's own pose as the decadent noble Lord Golden, he stays in the castle and teaches his new Skill coterie, including the overeager Chade. His search leads him to a most unlikely candidate; a mentally-challenged young man named Thick, suspicious after years of mistreatment but stronger in the Skill than anyone Fitz has ever encountered.

At the same time, the Six Duchies also faces what may be its salvation in a long-term peace, or a new threat to the fragile peace that has existed since the end of the Red Ship War. Queen Kettricken plans to betroth Dutiful to the Outislander Narcheska (Princess) Elliania, to forge a lasting alliance between the two lands as her marriage to Verity once did. The task is less simple than it appears, and Fitz becomes aware of wheels within wheels, as different interests war with each other with the stakes higher than anyone has imagined. These finally come to a head as Elliania declares she will not wed Dutiful without his undertaking a quest to slay Icefyre, one of the last true dragons.

Editions
This edition's cover is illustrated by John Howe.

References 

2002 American novels
American fantasy novels
Novels by Robin Hobb
HarperCollins books